Ariel Alexandria Davis is an American former actress. She is best known for her role as Megan Evers in the 2003 film The Haunted Mansion. She is the daughter of Sydney Davis and Darryl Davis and the older sister of former The Bernie Mac Show star Dee Dee Davis.

Her first big screen role was in The Haunted Mansion which co-starred with Eddie Murphy. She has also appeared in many television shows, including Everybody Hates Chris as Keisha and ER as Kaitlin. Aree has also appeared on a few how-to TV commercials based on The Haunted Mansion film. After guest starring on 'Til Death in 2008, Aree retired from acting. She has one child.

Filmography
 Power Rangers Lightspeed Rescue (2000, Episode: "A Face from the Past") as Ginny
 The Haunted Mansion (2003) as Megan Evers
 ER (2004, TV Series) as Kaitlin
 Everybody Hates Chris (2005–2006, TV Series) as Keisha Ridenhour
 14th Annual Inner City Destiny Awards (2006) as herself
 'Til Death (2008, TV Series) as Girl #1 (final appearance)

References

External links

 Aree Davis on Twitter

American video game actresses
African-American actresses
American television actresses
American film actresses
American voice actresses
American child actresses
Living people
Year of birth missing (living people)
21st-century African-American people
21st-century African-American women